Mumias is a town in Kakamega County of Kenya. The town has an urban population of 116,358 (2009 census) and is the second largest town in Kakamega County.
Mumias was the centre of the Mumias District. The town is linked by road to Kakamega (in east), Busia (west), Bungoma (north), Butere, Luanda, Maseno and Kisumu (south). Two major rivers, River Nzoia and River Lusumu pass close to the town. 

The town has four major hospitals namely, Mumias Level 4 Hospital (the largest) St.Marys' Mission hospital, Jamia Hospital and The Mumias Modern Dispensary. The town  has a modern bus park and a modern market. 

The town hosts the Office of the Member of Parliament for Mumias West, the office of the Deputy County Commissioner. The town has a stadium, Bomani Grounds, used for official meetings, political events, games and other events. 

The collapsed Mumias Sugar Company was a major employer in the region. The company owned the Mumias Sugar FC, which was one of the top football teams in Kenya until it was disbanded in 2007.

Five minutes outside Mumias town, on the road to Kakamega, there is a hospital, St. Mary's Mission Hospital and a medical college, St. Mary's School of Clinical Medicine. They are run by the Catholic Diocese of Kakamega (Mumias parish) which also sponsors several public primary and secondary schools namely: St. Mary's Girls High School, St. Anne's Mumias Primary School, St. Peter's Mumias Boys Primary School and St. Peter's Boys' High School.

Recreation 
The town has a number of hotels and recreation centers. Hotels found here include, Number 70 hotel, Westgate hotel, Amazon, etc
Night clubs include, Finito Sports Club and bar, Joe's Lounge, ValuValu etc

History 
The town is capital of the Luhya kingdom of Wanga. King Nabongo Mumia, who came to power in 1880, was the last sovereign king of Wanga. He was succeeded by his son Shitawa who ruled after his death in 1949 till the late seventies. He then was succeeded by Mumia II who is currently in power. His role remains largely non executive, but the royal family draws taxes from the trade that goes on in the county council of Mumias, which is to date still regarded as the seat of power. This includes taxes from the Mumias Sugar Company. The family still owns the land in the county although bits and pieces have been sold off to private developers. The entire Royal Family is still very closely linked to the choices of political leaders in the region as well as to their royal ties of the Abashitsetse clan. Each family has its own meetings (families keep the family tree with major families arising from the last sovereign Wanga government, with the brothers of King Mumia forming the Patriarchal Heads of the family). Mumias has a noticeable Muslim community, unique in western Kenya. It derives from trade links between Wanga state and coastal Kenya.
The town with two sub counties Mumias East and Mumias West in the larger county of Kakamega, is home to various Evangelical, Pentecostal and traditional Christian denominations.
The town was known as Lureko until it was renamed Mumias.

The Nabongo Cultural Centre in Matungu showcasing the Wanga Kingdom was opened in the outskirts of Mumias in 2008, near the traditional homestead of Wanga kings (Nabongos).

Religion 
The town has two major religions, Christianity and Muslims although most other religions are found here. There are very many churches is the town and surrounding areas. 

The area of Lukoye has a mosque called "Sheikh Khalifa Mosque", which was built in 1991 with Kuwaiti assistance. Other mosques have since been set up such as the one in Ekero area.

See also
Charles William Hobley

References

Further reading 
Rough Guide to Kenya, 7th ed, 2002, p361

 
Kakamega County
Populated places in Western Province (Kenya)